Gnorismoneura chyta is a moth of the family Tortricidae. It is found in Vietnam.

The wingspan is 15 mm. The ground colour of the forewings is yellowish brown with a slight cinnamon hue, suffused brown along the dorsum and tinged greyish in the terminal third. The hindwings are blackish brown.

Etymology
The name is derived from Greek chytos (meaning effusive).

References

Moths described in 2008
Archipini
Moths of Asia
Taxa named by Józef Razowski